Alexandra Osborne (born 8 April 1995) is an Australian tennis player.

Osborne has career-high rankings by the Women's Tennis Association (WTA) of 626 in singles, reached on 21 October 2019, and 296 doubles, achieved on 19 September 2022.

She made her WTA Tour main-draw debut at the 2021 Phillip Island Trophy, where she entered the doubles draw, partnering Astra Sharma. She won her first ITF title at Monastir, Tunisia, in April 2021, partnering New Zealander Paige Hourigan.

ITF Circuit finals

Doubles: 7 (1 title, 6 runner–ups)

Notes

References

External links

Alexandra Osborne at Arizona State University

1995 births
Living people
Australian female tennis players
Tennis players from Sydney
Arizona State Sun Devils women's tennis players
21st-century Australian women